Unknown Worlds: Tales from Beyond is an anthology of fantasy fiction short stories edited by Stanley Schmidt and Martin H. Greenberg, the sixth of a number of anthologies drawing their contents from the American magazine Unknown of the 1930s-1940s. It was first published in hardcover by Galahad Books in 1989, though bearing a copyright date of 1988, and reprinted by Bristol Park Books in 1993.

The book collects twenty-five tales by various authors, together with an introduction by Schmidt.

Contents
 "Introduction" (Stanley Schmidt)
 "Trouble with Water" (H. L. Gold) (Unknown, Mar. 1939)
 "The Cloak" (Robert Bloch) (Unknown, May 1939)
 "The Gnarly Man" (L. Sprague de Camp) (Unknown, June 1939)
 "The Misguided Halo" (Henry Kuttner) (Unknown, Aug. 1939)
 "Two Sought Adventure" (Fritz Leiber) (Unknown, Aug. 1939)
 "When It Was Moonlight" (Manly Wade Wellman) (Unknown Fantasy Fiction, Feb. 1940)
 "The Pipes of Pan" (Lester del Rey) (Unknown Fantasy Fiction, May 1940)
 "It" (Theodore Sturgeon) (Unknown Fantasy Fiction, Aug. 1940)
 "Fruit of Knowledge" (C. L. Moore) (Unknown Fantasy Fiction, Oct. 1940)
 "The Wheels of If" (L. Sprague de Camp) (Unknown Fantasy Fiction, Oct. 1940)
 "The Bleak Shore" (Fritz Leiber) (Unknown Fantasy Fiction, Nov. 1940)
 "They" (Robert A. Heinlein) (Unknown Fantasy Fiction, Apr. 1941)
 "Armageddon" (Fredric Brown) (Unknown Fantasy Fiction, Aug. 1941)
 "Mr. Jinx" (Fredric Brown and Robert Arthur (as by Arthur alone)) (Unknown Fantasy Fiction, Aug. 1941)
 "A Gnome There Was" (Henry Kuttner and C. L. Moore (as by Kuttner alone) (Unknown Worlds, Oct. 1941)
 "Hereafter, Inc." (Lester del Rey) (Unknown Worlds, Dec. 1941)
 "Snulbug" (Anthony Boucher) (Unknown Worlds, Dec. 1941)
 "The Refugees" (Frank Belknap Long) (Unknown Worlds, Feb. 1942)
 "Hell Is Forever" (Alfred Bester) (Unknown Worlds, Aug. 1942)
 "The Hag Séleen" (Theodore Sturgeon and James H. Beard (as by Sturgeon alone) (Unknown Worlds, Dec. 1942)
 "The Witch" (A. E. van Vogt) (Unknown Worlds, Feb. 1943)
 "Conscience, Ltd." (Jack Williamson) (Unknown Worlds, Aug. 1943)
 "Greenface" (James H. Schmitz) (Unknown Worlds, Aug. 1943)
 "Hell Hath Fury" (Cleve Cartmill) (Unknown Worlds, Aug. 1943)
 "Blind Alley" (Malcolm Jameson) (Unknown Worlds, June 1943)

Notes

1989 anthologies
Fantasy anthologies
Stanley Schmidt anthologies
Martin H. Greenberg anthologies
Works originally published in Unknown (magazine)